Isabelle "Izzy" Beisiegel (née Blais, born February 6, 1979), is a female professional golfer from Quebec, Canada. Before her first attempt qualifying for the PGA Tour Q-School in 2004, Beisiegel was quoted as saying, "The ball doesn't know if it is a man or a woman who is hitting it." She married former University of Oklahoma football defensive back, Dan Beisiegel, on February 29, 2000.

Woman's golf achievements
NCAA All-American 1997-1998 for the University of Oklahoma.
Tied for 36th at 1998 U.S. Women's Open.
Medalist at 2003 LPGA Q-School.
Spent 2004 on LPGA Tour.
Finished 11th and shot an LPGA course record of 65 in the final round of the 2004 Office Depot Championship (El Caballero Country Club; Los Angeles, California).
Earned her first LPGA top-10 finish (7th place) at the 2004 Kellogg-Keebler Classic (Stonebridge Country Club; Aurora, Illinois).

Men's golf achievements
Attended 2004 PGA Tour Qualifying School, becoming the first woman to compete in the event.
Earned Canadian Tour card for 2011, becoming the first female player to earn a playing card on a men's professional golf tour. However, she did not make the cut in any of the six tour events she played, and lost the card after the 2011 season.
Shot a 74 and finished in the top third of the field (39th place) at the 2012 men's U.S. Open Local Qualifier (Miramont Country Club; College Station, Texas).

References

External links
Yahoo sports profile

Canadian female golfers
LPGA Tour golfers
Golfing people from Quebec
Oklahoma Sooners women's golfers
1979 births
Living people